Rochdale Infirmary is an acute general hospital in Rochdale, Greater Manchester, England. It is managed by the Northern Care Alliance NHS Foundation Trust.

History
The infirmary was established as the Rochdale Infirmary and Dispensary by Clement Royds, a local banker, in South Parade in 1832. It moved to Lord Street a few months later.

A new purpose-built hospital was initiated following a donation by Thomas Watson, a local mill owner, and was opened by John Bright in Whitehall Street in 1883; it was expanded when a new wing was opened by King George V in July 1913. The facility joined the National Health Service as the Rochdale Infirmary in 1948.

In June 2011 maternity and inpatient children's services were transferred to Royal Oldham Hospital.

References

Hospitals in Greater Manchester
NHS hospitals in England
Buildings and structures in Rochdale